Mbhongweni (formerly Mbongweni) is a village in Winnie Madikizela-Mandela Local Municipality in the Eastern Cape province of South Africa. It is situated 33 km away from Mbizana.

The village is popularly known for the birth of Winnie Madikizela Mandela and Babalo Madikizela.

Births 
Winnie Madikizela-Mandela - (1936-2018) Anti-Apartheid Movement activist, president of the African National Congress Women's League 

 Babalo Madikizela - (b. 1976) Eastern Cape MEC for Public Works

References 

Populated places in the Mbizana Local Municipality